Red sunflower is a common name for several plants and may refer to:

 Various cultivars of Sunflower, including "Prado Red" and "Red Sun"
 Tithonia rotundifolia, native to North America